Stevenson House is a mansion near the village of Haddington, East Lothian, Scotland.

History
The estate was once owned by the William Douglas of Straboc before being purchased by the Sinclair family in 1624. 

A castle may have existing at the site prior to the current mansion house. On 16 May 1544 a residence was destroyed after the burning of Edinburgh by Lord Hertford during the Rough Wooing. It was rebuilt in 1560 and the current mansion house incorporates that building.

References

Clan Sinclair
Listed buildings in East Lothian